Shwe Htoo (born Htoo Khant 19 September 1992), is a Burmese singer-songwriter and actor. His first solo album The Imagination Book was released in 2015.

Early life and education
Shwe Htoo was born on 19 September 1992 in Yangon, Myanmar. He attended at BEHS 2 Kamayut (St.Augustine).

Music career
He began his music career by singing love songs and uploading his songs on internet. He has become popular due to his songs. In 2014, his debut album Four was released alongside Htet Yan, X Boxin and Lil Z. His second album The Imagination Book was released in 2015. In 2018, his third album I was released. In 2019, his single song "A Mone Pin" was popular among the audiences. In 2020, his single song "Ma Cele Thar 1 Le" was popular among audiences and celebrities on TikTok. Almost all of his songs were peaked at number one on Myanmar Top Chart on Joox.

Brand ambassador ship
He has been worked as a brand ambassador for Ve Ve Beverages Myanmar.

Discography

Album
Four (2014)
The Imagination Book (2015)
I (2018)

Single
Barmeton (2017)
Don't Leave Me Alone (2017)
A Marr with Shwe Hmone Yati (2018)
A Mone Pin (2019)
Ma Cele Thar 1 Le with Timmy (2020)
Moe Sat Myar Ka Pyaw Thaw with Shwe Hmone Yati (2020)

Filmography

Film (Cinema)
Pat Pat Sat Sat Nhyoe (2017)
Guest (2019)
Legend of the Rain (2019)
Kan (2020)

Awards
Male Singer Award of Most Requested Song for 2016 (Shwe FM 7th Anniversary)
Male Singer Award of Best Selling Studio Album Award for 2016 (City FM 15th Anniversary)
Male Singer Award of Most Requested Song Award for 2018 (City FM 17th Anniversary)
Joox Top 10 Artists Award for 2019

Personal life
He is married to Shwe Hmone Yati in 2018.

References

External links
 

1992 births
Living people
People from Yangon
21st-century Burmese male singers